Hollow Man is a 2000 science fiction horror film directed by Paul Verhoeven, written by Andrew W. Marlowe, and starring Elisabeth Shue, Kevin Bacon, Josh Brolin, Kim Dickens, Greg Grunberg, Joey Slotnick, Mary Randle, and William Devane. The film is about Sebastian Caine, a scientist who volunteers to be the first human test subject for a serum that renders the user invisible. When his fellow scientists are unable to restore him back to normal, he becomes increasingly psychotic and eventually goes on a killing spree. The film received negative reviews but was a financial success, grossing $190 million worldwide. It was nominated for an Academy Award for Best Visual Effects in 2001, losing to Gladiator.

A direct-to-video stand-alone sequel called Hollow Man 2, starring Christian Slater and Peter Facinelli, was released in 2006.

Plot
Brilliant but narcissistic scientist Sebastian Caine has developed a serum for the military that can make a subject invisible. His team includes ex-girlfriend Linda McKay, Matt Kensington, Sarah Kennedy, Janice Walton, Carter Abbey, and Frank Chase. The team succeeds in reversing the procedure, returning an invisible gorilla to visibility. Sebastian becomes infatuated with Linda again, but, unbeknownst to him, she has become involved with Matt.

Instead of reporting his success to the military, Sebastian lies to an oversight committee, which includes his mentor Howard Kramer, telling them he is close but needs more time. He convinces part of the team to go into human testing without military authorization, keeping the rest in the dark. The procedure is successful, and Sebastian turns completely invisible. He enjoys sneaking around the lab in order to scare and play pranks on his fellow co-workers, one of which involves molesting Sarah. The team becomes concerned that Sebastian is taking it too far. The procedure to return him to visibility fails, and he is almost killed.

Sebastian is quarantined in the laboratory due to his condition, and the other researchers construct a latex mask for him to wear around the lab. With the constant testing done to him and unable to cope with the isolation, he defies instructions, leaves the building  and returns to his apartment. Once there, he quickly returns to his old habit of spying on his neighbor as she undresses - but this time realizes that he has the power and the freedom to take his voyeurism to the next step. Stripping naked, he sneaks into the neighbor's apartment and rapes her. Linda warns Sebastian that if he leaves again, she and Matt will tell the committee about the experiment. Ignoring their threat, Sebastian assembles a device that runs a video loop of his heat signature in his quarters. He leaves the lab again and spies on Linda and Matt, becoming enraged when he sees them about to have sex. The invisible man smashes their bedroom window, and though the two lovers almost immediately suspect Caine as the culprit, the looped video feed immediately diverts any suspicion from him. Becoming increasingly unstable, Sebastian later kills a dog being used as a lab animal in a fit of rage.

The team discovers they have been watching a recording, and Sebastian has been leaving the lab without their knowledge. Linda and Matt go to Kramer's house and confess their experiments. After they leave, Kramer attempts to alert the Army. Having followed Linda and Matt to the house, Sebastian cuts off Kramer's phone connection, then drowns him in his swimming pool. The next day, Sebastian waits until the whole team is inside the lab before he disables the phones and elevator codes except for his own. The rest of the team congregates and decides to hunt Sebastian down and subdue him. At the same time, he begins to murder the team members one by one, with Janice being his first victim after falling behind the others.

Linda and the others hide in the lab, while Matt and Carter take tranquilizer guns to hunt for Sebastian using thermography goggles. Sebastian mortally wounds Carter before getting into a fight with Matt. Linda saves Matt. Sebastian then kills Sarah and Frank, and locks an injured Matt and Linda in the freezer, leaving them to die. Linda constructs an electromagnet using a defibrillator to open the door, then gathers materials to assemble a flamethrower. Meanwhile, Sebastian builds a makeshift bomb that will destroy the facility after he leaves using explosive chemicals and a centrifuge; he destroys the keyboard so that nobody can stop the machine.

Just as Sebastian enters the elevator, Linda fires the flamethrower at him. Sebastian escapes and the two fight. Before Sebastian can kill Linda, Matt strikes him with a crowbar. Sebastian recovers and approaches Matt and Linda from behind with the crowbar, but Matt deflects the blow, throwing Sebastian into a nearby circuit box, shocking him and rendering him partially visible. Linda and Matt find the bomb, but cannot stop it. They attempt to climb a ladder in the elevator shaft to escape as the bomb explodes. Despite his injuries, Sebastian grabs Linda's ankle. He pulls her off the ladder and onto the top of the elevator. Sebastian asks Linda for one last kiss for old times sake, so while they kiss, Linda disconnects the elevator cables, causing the partially visible Sebastian to fall to his death down the shaft. Linda and Matt emerge from the burning lab and emergency personnel take them away in an ambulance.

Cast

 Elisabeth Shue as Linda McKay, Sebastian's ex-girlfriend and co-worker who now has a relationship with Matt. Sebastian remains oblivious to this.
 Kevin Bacon as Dr. Sebastian Caine, an ambitious molecular biologist who has developed a serum that can render the subject invisible. 
 Josh Brolin as Matthew "Matt" Kensington, Linda's new boyfriend and co-worker to both her and Sebastian.
 Kim Dickens as Dr. Sarah Kennedy, the feisty and rational veterinarian of the team who disapproves of the animal testings being done and has a strong dislike for Sebastian. 
 Greg Grunberg as Carter Abbey, an emergency medical technician. 
 Joey Slotnick as Frank Chase, a laboratory technician.
 Mary Jo Randle as Janice Walton, a laboratory technician. 
 William Devane as Dr. Howard Kramer, Sebastian's former mentor turned boss. 
 Rhona Mitra as Sebastian's Neighbor
 Pablo Espinosa as Ed, the security guard working at the lab.
 Margot Rose as Martha Kramer, Howard's wife
 Tom Woodruff Jr. as the in-suit performer of Isabelle the Gorilla, a gorilla that was used in the invisibility experiments.
 Gary A. Hecker as the vocal effects of Isabelle the Gorilla.

Production

Development
Following the multi-layered and controversial Starship Troopers (1997), Verhoeven wanted to tone down the levels of sex and violence in his next film, aiming to make a more "conventionally commercial blockbuster". Approximately $50 million of the film's $95 million budget was reserved for visual effects work, which was primarily worked on by Sony Pictures Imageworks (SPI) and Tippett Studio. Of the 560 visual effects shots in the film, approximately two-thirds were worked on by SPI and the remaining third by Tippett Studio. Verhoeven also storyboarded most of the film, as he had done with all of his American films after experiencing trouble coordinating the action of Flesh+Blood (1985). He maintains that over 90% of the film is how he storyboarded it, as it was expensive (costing up to $300,000) if he decided to change a camera movement.

Filming
The film was shot in chronological order, partially due to the fact that the laboratory set would be physically blown up near the end of the story, a sequence that was captured by 14 cameras at various angles. Principal photography began on April 16, 1999. Six weeks into filming, Elisabeth Shue tore her Achilles tendon, which shut down production on June 25 for over seven weeks. At one point, producers considered replacing her; however, shooting resumed on August 18, 1999, and ran until February 4, 2000.

Hollow Man was one of very few films allowed to shoot directly in front of The Pentagon building, with Verhoeven expressing surprise that the script was approved, because of the themes of the United States Government commissioning scientific experiments into making living beings invisible. Many of the location scenes were shot in and around Washington, D.C., with a restaurant set also being constructed in a building overlooking the U.S. Capitol. The laboratory scenes were shot at Sony Pictures Studios in Culver City, California; the elevator shaft used in the film's climax was built onto the side of the studio's parking garage.

A thermal imaging camera was employed for scenes showing "invisible" animals (most notably Isabelle the gorilla) or Sebastian following his transformation and the unsuccessful attempt to restore him to visibility; the same technique was used for characters when they look through thermal goggles. As Isabelle was played in part by a man in a gorilla suit, crew members had to stand by and warm the suit with hair dryers in order for the thermal camera to accurately emulate an actual gorilla's warmth.

Despite assumptions that Bacon would not be needed on set except when his character Sebastian is visible, Verhoeven and the crew realized after test footage was shot that he would need to be present to interact with the cast, as "the other actors were stranded in empty space, and the scenes looked stiff, inorganic and unconvincing" without him. Guy Pearce and Edward Norton were also considered for the role of Sebastian before Bacon was chosen, in part for his "ability to be both charming and diabolical". At the time of Hollow Mans release, Bacon recounted a "bad morning" on which, among other mishaps, he read a story in the press that suggested Robert Downey, Jr. had been offered the film's title role.

Special effects
To achieve the effects of Sebastian being invisible, Bacon was digitally removed from the footage and each scene was shot twice: once with the actors and once without, for the background to be able to be seen through Sebastian's body. The crew used a motion-control camera, to ensure the same movements were achieved and the shots were then composited in post-production. For scenes where Sebastian was outlined in smoke, water and blood, Bacon wore a latex body suit, face mask, contact lenses and a dental plate all of one color; green was used for blood, blue for smoke, and black for water. Visual effects supervisor Craig Hayes then replaced Bacon with a digital clone to form an outline of his performance. To make the clone appear more like Bacon, information about "every aspect" of his body was recorded and the entirety of his body, including his genitals, was scanned into a computer. This special-effect performance earned Hayes a nomination to an Academy Award for Best Visual Effects, but he lost it to Gladiator.

Inspired after his daughter bought him books on the subject of écorchés at La Specola in Florence, Verhoeven enlisted special effects supervisor Scott Anderson to create a three-dimensional digital model of the inside of Bacon's body, to create the "transformation scene" where Sebastian becomes invisible. New volume-rendering software was required just to replicate the inside of Bacon's body. The scene depicts Sebastian disappearing in stages; first, his skin, followed by his muscles, organs (including his lungs and heart) and finally, his skeleton. Bacon detailed the complications of his role in a diary he kept while filming and believed the "sense of isolation, anger and suffering" that he felt while wearing the mask and body suit helped his performance.

The scene of an invisible Sebastian raping a woman in a neighboring apartment was shot in two versions, with the second showing her screaming as she is raped. The first was used when preview audiences reacted with disdain, deeming it "painful" and feeling it alienated them from Sebastian too early. Although excising certain shots from the version he called "stronger[,] harsher and at the same time more relevant [for Sebastian Caine]", Verhoeven did not actually intend to show the rape, claiming "a woman being raped by an invisible man would look silly and that's the last thing we'd want to do. [...] It wouldn't express in any way the severity of the violence happening at that moment." Regardless, it was Verhoeven's first film he did not have to recut and resubmit to the Motion Picture Association of America (MPAA) in order to achieve an R rating.

Themes
Professor of film and literature at California Polytechnic State University Douglas Keesey wrote in his illustrated book on the life and films of Verhoeven that the camera often adopts Sebastian's point of view, "tempting us to become voyeurs along with him, to get off on our ability to see without being seen". Elisabeth Shue categorized the film as a "story of the dark, seductive nature of evil" and also pointed out its voyeuristic qualities. Verhoeven commented: "Hollow Man leads you by the hand and takes you with Sebastian into teasing behaviour, naughty behaviour and then really bad and ultimately evil behaviour. At what point do you abandon him? I'm thinking when he rapes the woman would probably be the moment that people decide, 'This is not exactly my type of hero', though I must say a lot of viewers follow him further than you would expect."

Music

The soundtrack for Hollow Man was composed by Jerry Goldsmith, his third collaboration with Verhoeven after Total Recall (1990) and Basic Instinct (1992). Varèse Sarabande released it on CD on July 25, 2000.

Filmtracks.com found there to be two distinct motifs: the "transitional motif" of "bass thumping and [an] array of prickling electronic effects that slowly increase their pace and volume as the scenes [of invisibility] progress", heard in "Isabelle Comes Back" and "This Is Science"; and the "rambling piano and bass-element ostinato heard for the violent chasing" in both "The Elevator" and "The Big Climb". The site pointed out "the pulsating piano, woodwind, and electronic rhythm from [Basic Instinct] underneath a meandering, disembodied theme for high strings not much unlike [The Haunting]", and judged that the "action bursts, especially with the drum pad and synthesizer combos" were akin to Goldsmith's use of those elements in Total Recall. Overall, the site felt the score was "over the top", calling it "pieced together from other Goldsmith scores" and derivative while citing the first and second tracks as highlights.

Release
Despite a negative response from critics, the film debuted at #1 with $26.4 million in its opening weekend. During this time, the film achieved the second-highest August opening weekend, behind The Sixth Sense (1999). It was the first film since Mission: Impossible 2 to top the box office for multiple weeks. After fifteen weeks of release, Hollow Man had grossed in excess of $73.2 million in North America and just over $117 million elsewhere, making a total of $190.2 million worldwide, against its $95 million production budget. It was Verhoeven's biggest hit since Basic Instinct (1992).

Reception
On Rotten Tomatoes the film holds an approval rating of 26% based on 118 reviews, with an average rating of 4.35/10. The site's critics consensus states: "Despite awesome special effects, Hollow Man falls short of other films directed by Paul Verhoeven. This flick over time degenerates into a typical horror film." At Metacritic, the film has a weighted average score of 24 out of 100, based on from 35 critics, indicating "generally unfavorable reviews". Audiences polled by CinemaScore gave the film an average grade of "C" on an A+ to F scale.

While some critics criticized the plot and acting, with some claiming it contains hallmarks of slasher films and misogynistic undertones, most critics praised the visual effects employed in making Kevin Bacon appear to be invisible, which earned the film a nomination for Best Visual Effects at the 2001 Academy Awards.

Roger Ebert of the Chicago Sun-Times gave the film 2 stars out of 4, and complained that Verhoeven wasted potential by taking an invisible man and doing nothing more than having him go berserk. While ultimately feeling that the film is merely a slasher film with a science gimmick, Ebert praised the special effects, calling them "intriguing" and "astonishing", but felt the film lacked the "imagination and wit" of Verhoven's best films.

The film received three nominations at the 2000 Stinkers Bad Movie Awards: Worst On-Screen Group (the scientists), Worst Screenplay for a Film That Grossed over $100 Million Using Hollywood Math, and Most Unintentionally Funny Movie, but lost to Battlefield Earth and Gone in 60 Seconds, respectively. The film was also nominated for both Best Science Fiction Film and Best Music at the Saturn Awards and won Best Special Effects.

A fake review attributed to David Manning was revealed in late 2001 as a hoax, created by Sony to fake publicity for the film.

Verhoeven was not happy with the movie. In 2013, he told The Hollywood Reporter:
As of 2022, Hollow Man was Verhoeven's final film produced by a major American production company.

Home media
Hollow Man was released on DVD and VHS in North America by Columbia TriStar Home Entertainment on January 2, 2001. It was released with its widescreen theatrical aspect ratio of 1.85:1 and included various special features, including two audio commentaries—one with Verhoeven, writer Andrew W. Marlowe and Kevin Bacon, and another with composer Jerry Goldsmith and the isolated score of the film; the HBO making-of featurette "Hollow Man: Anatomy of a Thriller"; 15 mini-featurettes on the making of the film, several detailing storyboards of progress shots with commentary; three deleted scenes with commentary by Verhoeven; visual effects picture-in-picture comparisons of the raw footage with the final scene; cast and crew biographies; a teaser and a theatrical trailer. In the years that followed, both a deluxe Superbit edition was made, as well as a director's cut of the film, which restored nearly seven minutes of footage—primarily extended cuts of existing scenes including Linda and Matthew in bed, the rape scene, Sebastian killing the dog and the aftermath of Sarah being suspicious of Sebastian.

The director's cut version of the film was released on Blu-ray October 16, 2007 with a 1080p resolution. Although lacking any commentaries, it restores most other special features. A two-disc double pack including the stand-alone sequel Hollow Man 2 was released on DVD in 2006 while Mill Creek Entertainment released the Blu-ray version on March 26, 2013. Mill Creek also released the director's cut in their Dark Passengers 8 movie DVD collection on October 1, 2013, 24 Horror DVD collection on March 7, 2017, and The 6 Degrees Blu-ray collection on April 3, 2018. On July 8, 2019, both films were released on Blu-ray Collector's Edition by 88 Films, including the theatrical cut of the first film.

References

External links

 
 
 
 
 
 

2000 films
2000 horror films
2000s science fiction horror films
2000s monster movies
American science fiction horror films
American monster movies
Columbia Pictures films
Films about invisibility
Films about mass murder
Films about scientists
Films based on The Invisible Man
Films produced by Douglas Wick
Films directed by Paul Verhoeven
Films scored by Jerry Goldsmith
Films set in Washington, D.C.
Films shot in Los Angeles
Films shot in Washington, D.C.
English-language German films
German science fiction horror films
2000s English-language films
2000s American films
2000s German films